Ilkka Koivula (born 16 March 1966) is a Finnish actor. He has appeared in 28 films and television shows since 1988. He starred in the film Lights in the Dusk, which was entered into the 2006 Cannes Film Festival.

Selected filmography
 Freakin' Beautiful World (1997)
 Bad Luck Love (2000)
 Badding (2000)
 Rentun Ruusu (2001)
 Eila (2003)
 Lights in the Dusk (2006)

References

External links

1966 births
Living people
Finnish male film actors
People from Ranua
20th-century Finnish male actors
21st-century Finnish male actors